Julia Benson (née Anderson; 26 June 1979) is a Canadian actress. She played the character Vanessa James in the science fiction series Stargate Universe.

Early life
Julia Anderson was born in Winnipeg, Manitoba, Canada. She trained as a ballet, tap, jazz dancer since age six. She graduated from the University of British Columbia (Vancouver) in 2001 with a degree in theatre and psychology. She trained as an actress at David Mamet's Atlantic Theater Company in New York City.

Career
Benson played the role of Anna in the 2007 film Road to Victory about a stripper who falls in love with a football player who is unable to sexually perform due to an injury. She trained with a dancer from Brandi's strip club in Vancouver, British Columbia.

From 2009 to 2011, Benson appeared as 2nd Lt. Vanessa James in both seasons of TV science fiction series Stargate Universe. Her performance in the show's first-season episode "Pain" earned her a 2010 Leo award as "Best Supporting Performance by a Female in a Dramatic Series".

Filmography

Films

Television

References

External links

 

1979 births
Living people
Actresses from Winnipeg
Canadian film actresses
Canadian television actresses
University of British Columbia alumni